Jenny B. Merrill (September 4, 1854 – February 19, 1934) was an American early childhood educator and author. The first articles published in the U.S. regarding Montessori education were written by Merrill.

Biography
Jane Beggs Merrill was born in New York City, September 4, 1854. Her parents were Benjamin B. and Jane Anne McBride Merrill.

In 1871, she graduated from Normal College (now Hunter College), and in 1892, she received a Doctorate in Pedagogy from New York University.

Merrill served as the Supervisor of Public Kindergartens of New York City; President of the Kindergarten Department of the National Education Association; and Honorary President of the Public School Kindergarten Association of New York City.

Jenny B. Merrill died of pneumonia in New York City, February 19, 1934.

Selected works
 Songs for Little Folks : a Collection Adapted for the Home Circle and the Primary Classes in Sunday and Day Schools (1875; with Mrs. Wilbur F. Crafts)
 Pictures and stories for our darlings (1879)
 Little folks Bible gallery (1880)
 Bible pictures and stories for little folks (1881)
 Shield and Buckler (1886)
 The children's Bible hour (1888)
 Bible Talks about Bible Pictures (1889)
 A psychological study ... : from a letter written in reply to a friend's questions regarding the development of a child's early idea of number (1891)
 Outline course for vacation kindergartens. (1899)

References

1854 births
1934 deaths
19th-century American non-fiction writers
19th-century American women writers
Educators from New York City
Writers from New York City
American religious writers
Kindergarten
New York University alumni
Hunter College alumni
American education writers
Deaths from pneumonia in New York City